Manitoba First,(), was a provincial political party in the Canadian province of Manitoba. It was registered by Elections Manitoba on March 24, 2016. It ran 16 candidates in the 2016 general election, garnering 4,887 votes, or 1.1 per cent of the total vote.

Steven Fletcher, who was elected to the Legislative Assembly of Manitoba in 2016 as a Progressive Conservative, joined the party in September 2018, but did not seek re-election in the September 2019 general election. The party won no seats in that election.

The party deregistered on March 3, 2022.

Leadership controversy 
In September 2018, then-independent MLA Steven Fletcher became leader of the Manitoba Party, despite the protestations of previous board members who claimed they were unaware of Fletcher's plans. Two of these former board members filed court documents in December 2018, seeking Fletcher's ouster after claiming that the previous leader, Gary Marshall, "gave" Fletcher the leadership without authority, as Marshall had been removed as party leader following a unanimous vote during a board meeting in July 2018. Marshall claimed the board meeting never occurred, while Fletcher maintains he knew nothing about any internal disputes, and that the leadership change was done in accordance with the law.

On May 22, Fletcher announced he would be running in the 2019 Canadian federal election as a candidate for the People's Party of Canada. He ran in the federal riding of Charleswood—St. James—Assiniboia—Headingley, which he had previously represented from 2004 to 2015 as a member of the Conservative Party of Canada. Subsequently, Fletcher resigned as leader of the party and David Sutherland, 2016 candidate in the riding of Dawson Trail, was listed as leader.

2016 platform 
In an interview with the Canadian Broadcasting Corporation in January 2016, then-leader Gary Marshall stated the new party is "...a party of tax cuts", and its platform included a pledge to lower the provincial sales tax rate to 5 per cent from 8 per cent, removal of PST charges on all food purchases, and changing the personal and business income tax rates to a flat 10 per cent, among other proposals.

The party also proposed to remove all red light and speed cameras from intersections and mobile units, eradicate government regulations "... that impede trade and commerce", and changing how tax revenues are allocated among education, municipalities, and so on.

Election results

References

External links 
 

Provincial political parties in Manitoba
2016 establishments in Manitoba
2016 in Canadian politics
Political parties established in 2016
Classical liberal parties
Libertarian parties
Libertarianism in Canada